MQ: Transforming Mental Health is an international mental health research charity. The charity was created in 2013, with initial funding from the Wellcome Trust, to raise funds from the general public for research. 

The charity's vision is to create a world where mental illnesses are understood, effectively treated and one day made preventable. It funds multi-disciplinary research into mental health, across the spectrum of biological, psychological, and social sciences.

Whilst the charity is based in the UK, it has an international focus and funds research globally.

MQ's research program focuses on four specific areas:  supporting future generations, improving current treatments, promoting research leadership, and utilizing mental health data.

The MQ fellows award provides successful applicants with up to £225,000 over 3 years to support research exploring new ways to understand, treat or prevent mental illness. 20 fellows have so far been selected for 2017, 2016, 2015, 2014, and 2013.

A large international scientific meeting dedicated to mental health science is organized through the charity. It has been running annually every February since 2014.

The CEO of MQ is Lea Milligan, formerly the executive director of Mercy Ships UK. He took up the post at the end of June 2020.

The chair of MQ is Shahzad Malik, general partner of Advent Life Sciences. He took over from Sir Philip Campbell, the editor-in-chief of Nature.

References

Mental health organisations in the United Kingdom
Psychiatric research